Mohsen Azarbad (born 12 November 1989) is an Iranian professional footballer who plays as a winger for Persian Gulf Pro League club Mes Rafsanjan.

References

External links
 

1989 births
Living people
Sportspeople from Tehran
Iranian footballers
Association football wingers
F.C. Aboomoslem players
Sanat Naft Abadan F.C. players
PAS Hamedan F.C. players
Naft Masjed Soleyman F.C. players
Mes Rafsanjan players
Siah Jamegan players
Nassaji Mazandaran players
Gol Gohar players

Azadegan League players
Persian Gulf Pro League players